The starry catshark (Asymbolus galacticus) is a species of fish in the family Scyliorhinidae found in New Caledonia.

Catsharks of this genus have a slim body and variegated colour pattern, narrow snout, long labial furrows, equal-size dorsal fins, and small anal fin (smaller than the dorsal fins).

References

starry catshark
Fish of New Caledonia
Endemic fauna of New Caledonia
starry catshark